Rocky Mountain Pictures is an American film distributor. It was created by Ron Rodgers and Randy Slaughter. It was headquartered in Salt Lake City, Utah. It specialized in distributing conservative films. In 2016, the company was sold and moved to Chicago. Its focus changed to black, Latino and Asian-made indie films.

Filmography
Expelled: No Intelligence Allowed (2008)
Standing Ovation (2010)
2016: Obama's America (2012)
Hardflip (2012)
Hating Breitbart (2012)
Last Ounce of Courage (2012)
Runaway Slave (2012)
The Principle (2014)
Grow House (2017)

References

External links

Film distributors of the United States
Conservative media in the United States
Companies based in Salt Lake City